Kalisz is a surname. Notable people with the surname include:

 Armand Kaliz (born Kalisz, 1882–1941), American actor
 Chase Kalisz (born 1994), American swimmer
  (born 1926), Polish-born French architect
 John Kalisz, American comics artist
 Raymond Kalisz (1927–2010), American-born Papua New Guinean Roman Catholic bishop
 Ryszard Kalisz (born 1957), Polish politician

See also
 

Polish-language surnames